Ellen Peters may refer to:

 Ellen Ash Peters (born 1930), Connecticut Supreme Court justice
 Ellen Dolly Peters (1894–1995), Montserratian trade unionist and educator
 Ellen Peters (professor), decision psychologist